John Ostler (1873–1956) was a Scottish footballer who played in the Scottish Football League for Motherwell and in the English Football League for Bury, Middlesbrough and Newcastle United.

References

1873 births
1956 deaths
Footballers from North Lanarkshire
Scottish footballers
Association football midfielders
Motherwell F.C. players
Bury F.C. players
Newcastle United F.C. players
Middlesbrough F.C. players
Scottish Football League players
English Football League players
People from Newarthill